Jeffrey Guy Grey (19 March 1959 – 26 July 2016) was an Australian military historian. He wrote two volumes of The Official History of Australia's Involvement in Southeast Asian Conflicts 1948–1975, and several other high-profile works on Australia's military history. He was the first non-American to become the president of the Society for Military History, but is perhaps best known as the author of A Military History of Australia (first edition 1990).

Early life and education
Jeffrey Guy Grey was born on 19 March 1959, the son of Ron Grey, an Australian Army officer and his wife Patricia. He had two sisters, Penny and Gina. His family was a military one; his father eventually reached the rank of major general, and two of his uncles became brigadiers. Raised as an Army brat, he moved about frequently; but lived most of his early life in Canberra, where he settled. He entered the Australian National University, from which he graduated in 1983, and joined the Faculty of Military Studies at the Royal Military College, Duntroon, as a teaching fellow. He completed his doctorate there under the supervision of Peter Dennis, writing his 1985 thesis on "British Commonwealth forces in the Korean War: a study of a military alliance relationship".

Career
Grey joined the Historical Section of the Department of Foreign Affairs, but returned to the University of New South Wales at the new Australian Defence Force Academy (ADFA) campus in 1988, and became a professor there in 2003. Over the years he taught thousands of cadets and midshipmen, and supervised numerous postgraduate students. He wrote prolifically about the Korean War and the Vietnam War. With Peter Dennis he wrote about the Indonesian Confrontation in Emergency and Confrontation (1996), a volume of The Official History of Australia's Involvement in Southeast Asian Conflicts 1948–1975, and was the sole author of another volume in the series, Up Top (1998), which detailed the role of the Royal Australian Navy in the Malayan Emergency, the Indonesian Confrontation and the Vietnam War. He was perhaps best known as the author of A Military History of Australia (first edition 1990), a widely used single-volume textbook.

With his colleagues at ADFA, he produced the Oxford Companion to Australian Military History. He wrote the volume on the Australian Army for the Oxford Australian Centenary History of Defence, and the volume on The War with the Ottoman Empire (2015) for The Centenary History of Australia and the Great War, a project for which he was a driving force. In cooperation with Peter Dennis and Roger Lee from the Army History Unit, he ran the  annual Army History Conference, for which he managed to secure distinguished historians from around the world as speakers. For an Australian military historian, he was unusually well known outside Australia. He held the Major General Matthew C. Horner Chair of Military Theory at the United States Marine Corps University in Quantico, Virginia, from 2000 to 2002, and in 2015 he became the first non-American to become the President of the Society for Military History.

Grey died suddenly of a heart attack on 26 July 2016. A memorial service was held at the Anzac Memorial Chapel at Duntroon, conducted by Tom Frame, the former Anglican Bishop of the Australian Defence Force. He was survived by his father Ron; sisters Penny and Gina; his first wife, Gina, and their daughter Victoria and son Duncan; his second wife, Emma and their son Sebastian; and his step-daughters Hannah and Sophie. The October 2017 edition of The Journal of Military History was dedicated to Grey's memory, and featured several articles by or about him.

Published works

 Author
 
 
 
 
 
 
 
 
 
 

 Editor

References

Further reading
 

1959 births
2016 deaths
20th-century Australian historians
Australian National University alumni
Australian naval historians
Historians of World War I
Historians of World War II
People educated at Canberra Grammar School
University of New South Wales alumni
Academic staff of the University of New South Wales